Hypostomus renestoi is a species of catfish in the family Loricariidae. It is native to South America, where it occurs in the upper Paraguay River basin in Brazil. The species was described in 2018 by Cláudio Henrique Zawadzki, Hugmar Pains da Silva, and Waldo Pinheiro Troy alongside the redescription of Hypostomus latirostris. FishBase does not list this species.

References 

renestoi
Catfish of South America
Fish described in 2018